The Feast of Saint Nicholas (Dutch: Het Sint-Nicolaasfeest) is an oil-on-canvas painting executed c. 1665–1668 by Dutch master Jan Steen, which is now in the Rijksmuseum in Amsterdam. It measures 82 x 70.5 cm. The picture, painted in the chaotic Jan Steen style, depicts a family at home on December 5, the night celebrated in the Netherlands as the Feast of Saint Nicholas, or Sinterklaas.

Jan Steen and his contemporaries
Jan Steen was a Dutch genre painter of the 17th century. Dutch painting of the time, including the landscapes of Aelbert Cuyp and Jacob van Ruisdael, show a rustic intimacy that carried over into genre paintings of domestic scenes. The paintings of Jan Vermeer and Jan Steen detail the same sense of comfort in scenes from daily household life. As the Dutch economy thrived and the middle class of wealthy merchants grew, such domestic paintings rose in popularity. As members of the middle class became the new patrons of art, the traditional religious and historical subjects were less popular than the newer household scenes that offer direct glimpses into the lives of Dutch families of the time.

Painting in the Dutch Golden Age
Jan Steen falls in the greater category of the Baroque period in painting. Baroque painting in the Netherlands was different from that in other countries in that it did not have the same idealized finery and magnificent grandeur. Instead, the Dutch style can be identified by its focus on extreme detail and realism, different even from neighboring Flanders and the splendid Flemish baroque paintings. 

Pictorial light: As they strived for extreme realism, Dutch Golden Age painters mastered the art of depicting the quality of light, particularly concentrating on the way that it behaved and reflected on various surfaces. 

Domestic detail: The revolution of oil paints in the 15th century made extreme detail possible in paintings. Dutch genre paintings like the Feast of Saint Nicholas exemplify this attention to detail in order to give an extremely realistic view of each genre scene. For example, the bread basket in the foreground of the painting shows the details of the woven wicker basket and the assorted crackers and nuts in the basket and spilled carelessly on the floor. Also in the basket the shiny outer coating of the bun and each individual seed that is used to garnish it, exemplifies not only the use of detail, but also Steen’s focus on light on various surfaces.

The painting in detail

The focal point of the painting is the youngest daughter of the family, a golden-child, painted, in fact, in a golden smock and showing golden locks. She has behaved all year, and Saint Nicholas has rewarded her by stuffing her shoe with a doll and other treats, which she carries in her bucket. The "doll" is a representation of John the Baptist.  The figure wears what appears to be a camel hair shirt and holds a long cross, both symbols tied to John the Baptist.  Being the patron saint of epilepsy, the little girl's insistence on holding on to the figure may suggest she suffers from childhood convulsions or epilepsy.  She is in stark contrast to her elder brother, standing to her right, who is sobbing, while another brother looks on, laughing. Apparently, the elder brother has been naughty, and his shoe, held up by an elder sister behind him, was left empty. Still there is hope for the sobbing boy. Hidden in the background, almost obscured by the draperies, his grandmother seems to beckon to him—perhaps she is hiding a gift for him too, behind the heavy curtains.

In the background, a boy holds a young child and points out to the youngster the chimney through which Saint Nicholas brought the gifts. His other brother is already singing a gleeful song of thanksgiving in appreciation of the gifts he has received.

The lower right hand corner of the painting actually reveals another popular style of painting. A basket of assorted traditional Christmas sweetmeats like honey cake, gingerbread, waffles, nuts, and apples is actually a miniature still life within the greater painting. Even more examples of the specially celebratory feasts of Christmastime appear on the left side of the foreground. The apple and the coin are references to the old tradition of giving hidden apples and coins to friends as presents. A special diamond shaped caked called a duivekater, leans up against the table and marks the special occasion. In another painting by Steen, the Leiden baker, this same pastry also appears.  

The child near the chimney is holding a symbol of the struggle between Catholics and Protestants, a gingerbread man in the shape of St. Nicholas. The delicacy, still enjoyed around the fifth of December, was seen as an example of Catholic worship of saints and was not approved of by Protestant authorities. In the seventeenth century, the baking of such figures of saints (especially St. Nicholas) was banned. In 1655 in the city of Ultrecht an ordinance was passed which forbade "the baking of likenesses in bread or cake".

Steen's legacy
Unlike Vermeer’s paintings of the same era, Jan Steen’s conscious choice to portray the chaos and imperfections that dominated this domestic scene is a commentary on the society of the time. Through this painting and his sense of realism, Steen is able to highlight ongoing flaws and problems in society. A subtle form of commentary and criticism, Jan Steen paved the way for later artists like William Hogarth in his Marriage A La Mode series to use painting as a medium for satire.

References

Sources
 "Old Dutch Masters. Jan Steen", in Century Magazine, December, 1893.

External links

Het Sint-Nicolaasfeest at the Rijksmuseum Amsterdam

1660s paintings
Paintings in the collection of the Rijksmuseum
Paintings by Jan Steen
Sinterklaas
Paintings of children